Wire is the seventh album by Christian rock band Third Day. It breaks from the style of the band's previous albums to return to simple, rock and roll-driven melodies. To quote Allmusic's review of the album, "Third Day has stripped away the shine and gotten back to the grittiness of being a rock & roll band." The album is largely carried by the energetic guitar riffs that pervade its songs, although the forceful lyrics also contribute significantly.

The album's songs deal with numerous themes. "Wire", the title track, is a song about the pressure to succeed in modern society. "I Believe", "I Got a Feeling", "Innocent", and other tracks deal with sin, faith, and renewal from a Christian perspective. "Billy Brown" is a song that explores the readiness of people to follow and even idolize entertainment figures.

In November 2004, a live version of Wire was released, called Live Wire featuring a DVD and CD of songs from their tour of their latest album.

The album won 2005 Grammy Award for Best Rock Gospel Album.

Track listing

Personnel 
Third Day
 Mac Powell – acoustic guitar, lead and backing vocals
 Brad Avery – guitars
 Mark Lee – guitars
 Tai Anderson – bass
 David Carr – drums

Additional personnel
 Paul Ebersold – acoustic guitar, acoustic piano, church organ, Hammond B3 organ, Mellotron, programming, string arrangements

Production

 Paul Ebersold – producer
 Terry Hemmings – executive producer
 Dave Novik – executive producer
 Dan Raines – executive producer
 Robert Beeson – A&R consultant
 Don McCollister – engineer
 Skidd Mills – engineer
 Mac Attkisson – second engineer
 Scott Hardin – second engineer
 Billy Bowers – additional engineer
 Matt Goldman – pre-production engineer
 Brendan O'Brien – mixing at Southern Tracks, Atlanta, Georgia
 Karl Egsieker – mix assistant
 Bob Ludwig – mastering at Gateway Mastering, Portland, Maine
 Michelle Pearson – A&R production
 Scott Hughes – art direction
 Stephanie McBrayer – art direction, stylist
 Bert Sumner – cover and packaging
 Marina Chavez – photography
 Traci Scrignoli – stylist, hair

Awards

On 2005, the album won a Dove Award for Rock/Contemporary Album of the Year at the 36th GMA Dove Awards. The song "Come on Back to Me" was also nominated for Rock Recorded Song of the Year.

Charts

References

2004 albums
Third Day albums
Essential Records (Christian) albums
Grammy Award for Best Rock Gospel Album